Rear Admiral Robert Kenneth Tarrant,  (born 1961) is a retired Royal Navy officer who served as Commander Operations from 2015 to 2017.

Naval career
Educated at Cheltenham College, Tarrant joined the Royal Navy in 1979 and saw action in the destroyer  during the Falklands War in 1982. He was given command of the submarine  in 1997 and the patrol ship  in 2007, and went on to be Director of Naval Staff in December 2008. He remained the post until August 2011. After attending the Royal College of Defence Studies, he became Commander of Combined Task Force 150, responsible for maritime security from the Red Sea to the Gulf of Oman, in September 2012, and Commander United Kingdom Maritime Forces in January 2013 as well as fulfilling the role of Operation Commander of the European Union Naval Force Somalia Operation Atalanta. He served as Commander Operations from October 2015 to October 2017.

Tarrant was appointed a Companion of the Order of the Bath in the 2016 Birthday Honours.

References

|-

1961 births
Royal Navy admirals
People educated at Cheltenham College
Living people
Companions of the Order of the Bath
Graduates of the Royal College of Defence Studies
Royal Navy personnel of the Falklands War